Dreaming Lips is a 1953 German drama film directed by Josef von Báky and starring Maria Schell, O. W. Fischer and Philip Dorn. It was shot at the Wandsbek Studios and on location around Hamburg. The film's sets were designed by the art directors Emil Hasler and Peter Röhrig. It is a remake of the 1932 film Dreaming Lips by Paul Czinner. Czinner had also remade the film in Britain in 1937.

Cast
Maria Schell as Elisabeth
O. W. Fischer as Peter
Philip Dorn as Michael
Marga Maasberg as Marie
Eva Portmann as Christine
Günther Jerschke as Sekretär
Erwin Linder as Arzt

References

External links

1953 films
1953 romantic drama films
German romantic drama films
West German films
Films directed by Josef von Báky
Films with screenplays by Carl Mayer
German black-and-white films
Remakes of German films
German films based on plays
Films about violins and violinists
1950s German films
Films shot at Wandsbek Studios